The Burghers of Calais is a sculpture by Auguste Rodin in twelve original castings and numerous copies. It commemorates an event during the Hundred Years' War, when Calais, a French port on the English Channel, surrendered to the English after an eleven-month siege. The city commissioned Rodin to create the sculpture in 1884 and the work was completed in 1889.

History
In 1346, England's Edward III, after a victory in the Battle of Crécy, laid siege to Calais, while Philip VI of France ordered the city to hold out at all costs. Philip failed to lift the siege, and starvation eventually forced the city to parley for surrender.

The contemporary chronicler Jean Froissart (c. 1337 – c. 1405) tells a story of what happened next: Edward offered to spare the people of the city if six of its leaders would surrender themselves to him, presumably to be executed.  Edward demanded that they walk out wearing nooses around their necks, and carrying the keys to the city and castle. One of the wealthiest of the town leaders, Eustache de Saint Pierre, volunteered first, and five other burghers joined with him. Saint Pierre led this envoy of volunteers to the city gates.  It was this moment, and this poignant mix of defeat, heroic self-sacrifice, and willingness to face imminent death that Rodin captured in his sculpture, scaled somewhat larger than life.

According to Froissart's story, the burghers expected to be executed, but their lives were spared by the intervention of England's queen, Philippa of Hainault, who persuaded her husband to exercise mercy by claiming that their deaths would be a bad omen for her unborn child.

Composition
The City of Calais had attempted to erect a statue of Eustache de Saint Pierre, eldest of the burghers, since 1845.  Two prior artists were prevented from creating the sculpture: David d'Angers by his death, and Auguste Clésinger by the Franco-Prussian War. In 1884 the municipal corporation of the city invited several artists, Rodin amongst them, to submit proposals for the project.

Rodin's design, which included all six figures rather than just de Saint Pierre, was controversial. The public felt that it lacked "overtly heroic antique references" which were considered integral to public sculpture. It was not a pyramidal arrangement and contained no allegorical figures.  It was intended to be placed at ground level, rather than on a pedestal.  The burghers were not presented in a positive image of glory; instead, they display "pain, anguish and fatalism".  To Rodin, this was nevertheless heroic, the heroism of self-sacrifice.

In 1895 the monument was installed in Calais on a large pedestal in front of Parc Richelieu, a public park, contrary to the sculptor's wishes, who wanted contemporary townsfolk to "almost bump into" the figures and feel solidarity with them.  Only later was his vision realised, when the sculpture was moved in front of the newly completed town hall of Calais, where it now rests on a much lower base.

Depicted persons
The six burghers depicted are:
 Eustache de Saint Pierre
 Jacques de Wissant
 Pierre de Wissant
 Jean de Fiennes
 Andrieu d'Andres
 Jean d'Aire

Casts

Under French law no more than twelve original casts of works of Rodin may be made.

The 1895 cast of the group of six figures still stands in Calais.  Other original casts stand at:

 Glyptoteket in Copenhagen, cast 1903;
 the Musée royal de Mariemont in Morlanwelz, Belgium, cast 1905;
 Victoria Tower Gardens adjacent to the Houses of Parliament in London; cast 1908, installed on this site in 1914 and unveiled 19 July 1915;
 the Rodin Museum in Philadelphia, cast 1925 and installed in 1929;
 the gardens of the Musée Rodin in Paris, cast 1926 and given to the museum in 1955;
 Kunstmuseum in Basel, cast 1943 and installed in 1948;
 the Smithsonian Hirshhorn Museum and Sculpture Garden in Washington, DC, cast 1943 and installed in 1966;
 the National Museum of Western Art in Tokyo, cast 1953 and installed in 1959;
 the Norton Simon Museum in Pasadena, California, cast 1968;
 the Metropolitan Museum of Art in New York City, cast 1985 and installed in 1989; and 
 Plateau (formerly called Rodin Gallery and closed since 2016) in Seoul. This is the twelfth and final original cast and was cast in 1995.

Copies of individual statues are:
 sculptures of all individual figures on the campus of Stanford University;
 sculptures of Jean d'Aire and Jean de Fiennes as well as busts of d'Aire and Pierre de Wissant on display at the Los Angeles County Museum of Art in the Sculpture Garden;
 a study of Jean d'Aire at Visual Arts Center at Davidson College, cast in 1972; 
 "The man with the key" figure (Jean d'Aire), on the Sommerro Park in Oslo, Norway; and
 a bust of Jean d'Aire, recovered a quarter mile away from Ground Zero, together with other pieces from works by Rodin which were in the corporate offices of Cantor Fitzgerald at the original One World Trade Center.

Gallery

See also
List of sculptures by Auguste Rodin

Notes

References
 Elsen, Albert E. (1963).  Rodin.  New York:  Museum of Modern Art.
 Jianou, Ionel (1970, transl. Kathleen Muston and Geoffrey Skelding).  Rodin.  Paris:  ARTED.
 Laurent, Monique (1988, transl. 1989 by Emily Read).  Rodin.  New York:  Konecky & Konecky.  .

Further reading
 Benedek, Nelly Silagy (2000).  Rodin • The Burghers of Calais. New York: The Metropolitan Museum of Art.  .

External links

 Interactive 3D imagery of The Burghers of Calais
 Link to The Burghers of Calais on the official website of the Musée Rodin.
Rodin: The B. Gerald Cantor Collection, a full text exhibition catalogue from The Metropolitan Museum of Art, which contains material on The Burghers of Calais.
 Link to account of the theft and recovery of The Burghers of Calais during WWII:Williams College Magazine, Fall 2013.

Sculptures by Auguste Rodin
Calais
1889 sculptures
Outdoor sculptures in France
Outdoor sculptures in London
Sculptures of the Norton Simon Museum
Bronze sculptures in Paris
Bronze sculptures in Japan
Bronze sculptures in the City of Westminster
Bronze sculptures in the United States
Bronze sculptures
Grade I listed buildings in the City of Westminster
Statues in Japan
Statues in France
Monuments and memorials in the Pas-de-Calais
Buildings and structures in Victoria Tower Gardens
Buildings and structures on the River Thames
Sculptures of the Musée Rodin